Regent Mill, Failsworth is a Grade II listed former cotton spinning mill in Failsworth, Oldham, Greater Manchester, England. It was built by the Regent Mill Co Ltd. in 1905, and purchased by the Lancashire Cotton Corporation in 1930. It was taken over by the Courtaulds Group in 1964. On ceasing textile production it was occupied by Pifco Ltd, and then by Salton Europe Ltd who now occupy this site. It was driven by an 1800 hp twin tandem compound engine by Buckley & Taylor. It became a ring mill with 60,000 spindles in 1915, all provided by Platt Brothers.

Location

Failsworth is a town within the Metropolitan Borough of Oldham, in Greater Manchester, England. It lies on undulating ground, on the course of the Rochdale Canal and north bank of the River Medlock.

Regent Mill was built alongside the Rochdale Canal on Princess Street, but is now reached from the Oldham Road by way of Fir Street.

History
Historically a part of Lancashire, until the 19th century Failsworth was a small agricultural township linked, ecclesiastically, with the parish of Manchester. Farming was the main industry of this rural area, with locals supplementing their incomes by hand-loom weaving in the domestic system. The introduction of textile manufacture during the Industrial Revolution facilitated a process of unplanned urbanisation in the area, giving rise to Failsworth as a mill town, marked architecturally by several large redbrick cotton mills.

It was in the second half of the 19th century, that Oldham became the world centre for spinning cotton yarn. This was due in a large part to the formation of limited liability companies known as Oldham Limiteds. In 1851, over 30% of Oldham's population was employed within the textile sector, compared to 5% across Great Britain. At its zenith, it was the most productive cotton spinning mill town in the world,. By 1871 Oldham had more spindles than any country in the world except the United States, and in 1909, was spinning more cotton than France and Germany combined.

Regent Mill was built in 1906 by George Stott, during the third wave of the Joint-stock company boom, that was responsible for many companies referred to as Oldham Limiteds. The plans are extant in the Oldham Local Studies Centre.

The industry peaked in 1912 when it produced 8 billion yards of cloth. The great war of 1914–1918 halted the supply of raw cotton, and the British government encouraged its colonies to build mills to spin and weave cotton. The war over, Lancashire never regained its markets. The independent mills were struggling. The Bank of England set up the Lancashire Cotton Corporation in 1929 to attempt to rationalise and save the industry. Regent Mill, Failsworth was one of 104 mills bought by the LCC, and one of the 53 mills that survived through to 1950.
Post cotton it was occupied by Pifco Ltd, who later became Salton Europe Ltd. It is now the registered office of Spectrum Brands UK Ltd. and Russell Hobbs Ltd

Architecture
This was designed as a ring mill (thus lower head room was required than in a mule mill) it was  It was four storeys high. The cellar contained a warehouse, yarn cellar, waste room, cotton room, and dust room. The first floor was the card room. The second floor was the ring frame room. The third floor was the winding, warping and beaming room.

Power
It was powered by a marine type vertical triple expansion engines built by Buckley & Taylor of Oldham in 1906 with 1800 installed horsepower. The engine had a  low-pressure cylinder and was sometimes loaded to 2,000 ihp. It ran until 1958, when it was scrapped. It ran 60,000 spindles. There was a 26 ft flywheel, 26 ropes operated at 64 rpm.

See also

Listed buildings in Failsworth
Textile manufacturing

References

Bibliography

External links
 www.cottontown.org
 www.spinningtheweb.org.uk
 The Regent Cotton Mill, Failsworth
 Family history of the Overseer

Textile mills in the Metropolitan Borough of Oldham
Textile mills owned by the Lancashire Cotton Corporation
Grade II listed buildings in the Metropolitan Borough of Oldham
Grade II listed industrial buildings
Buildings and structures in the Metropolitan Borough of Oldham
Failsworth